James Stewart Jr. House is a historic home located at Christiana, New Castle County, Delaware.  It was built in the late-18th century, and is a two-story, five bay, brick dwelling. It consists of a three bay, double pile section and a two bay single pile section.  The front facade features a three bay, one story, hip-roofed facade porch with turned posts and added in the 20th century.

It was listed on the National Register of Historic Places in 1983.

References

Houses on the National Register of Historic Places in Delaware
Houses in New Castle County, Delaware
National Register of Historic Places in New Castle County, Delaware